Archie Uchena Madekwe (born 10 February 1995) is an English actor. He was named a 2017 Screen International Star of Tomorrow. He is best known for his roles in the Apple TV+ series See (2019–2022) and the A24 horror film Midsommar (2019).

Early life and education
Madekwe was born in South London. His parents divorced when he was young. At 14 he started studying Theatre at the BRIT School. Later, he also joined the National Youth Theatre. He continued his studies at the London Academy of Music and Dramatic Art (LAMDA), and left early when he was cast in Ian Rickson’s The Goat, or Who Is Sylvia? by Edward Albee on the West End opposite Damian Lewis and Sophie Okonedo.

Career
Madekwe made his television debut in 2014 with a guest appearance in an episode of the BBC medical drama Casualty. He then played Luca in two episodes of the Channel 4 comedy-drama Fresh Meat in 2016.

In 2017, Madekwe made his West End debut in The Goat, or Who Is Sylvia? at the Theatre Royal Haymarket alongside Damian Lewis and Sophie Okonedo. He landed his first named film role as Luke in Teen Spirit after the casting director saw him in the play. The same year he also appeared in the Channel 4 sitcom Hang Ups.

In 2019, Madekwe began starring as Kofun in the Apple TV+ science fiction series See, played Courfeyrac in the BBC One adaptation of Les Misérables, and starred as Simon in Ari Aster's A24 folk horror film Midsommar. In 2021, he appeared in the film Voyagers alongside Colin Farrell and Lily-Rose Depp and voiced Sedgwick in the Emmy winning "Ice" installment of the Netflix animated anthology series Love, Death & Robots.

Madekwe is set to lead Neill Blomkamp's sports film Gran Turismo. He also has upcoming roles in Heart of Stone for Netflix and Emerald Fennell's Saltburn.

Filmography

Film

Television

Stage

References

External links
 
 Archie Madekwe at Curtis Brown

Living people
1995 births
English male film actors
English male television actors
English male voice actors
English people of Nigerian descent
English people of Swiss descent
Black British male actors
21st-century English male actors
Male actors from London
Alumni of the London Academy of Music and Dramatic Art
People educated at the BRIT School
People from the London Borough of Lambeth